= Gireišiai =

Gireišiai may refer to the following villages in Lithuania:

- Gireišiai, Rokiškis District
- Gireišiai, Utena District
